ŠKM Liptovský Hrádok is a Slovak association football club located in Liptovský Hrádok. It currently plays in 3. liga (3rd tier in Slovak football system). The club was founded in 1992.

External links
Futbalnet profile 
Official club website

References

Football clubs in Slovakia
Association football clubs established in 1992
1992 establishments in Slovakia